Tetrahydrochrysene (THC) may refer to:

 (R,R)-Tetrahydrochrysene ((R,R)-THC)
 (S,S)-Tetrahydrochrysene ((S,S)-THC)